NGC 401 is a star located in the constellation of Pisces. It was discovered on December 30, 1866 by Robert Ball.

References

0401
Astronomical objects discovered in 1866
NGC 401
Discoveries by Robert Stawell Ball